The 2014 Maryland Senate election were held on November 4, 2014, to elect senators in all 47 districts of the Maryland Senate. Members were elected in single-member constituencies to four-year terms. These elections were held concurrently with various federal and state elections, including for Governor of Maryland.

Background 

The Democratic Party had held majority control of the Senate since the beginning of the 20th century. The closest that the Republican Party had come to gaining control since then was in 1918, when Democrats held a thin 14 to 13 majority.

In the 2014 elections, Governor Martin O'Malley was term-limited and Republicans sought to succeed him with businessman Larry Hogan. Capitalizing on a national red wave, the party successfully retook the governor's office and picked up nine seats in the General Assembly, including two seats in the Maryland Senate. Despite these gains, Democrats still retained their veto-proof supermajorities in both chambers of the Maryland General Assembly.

Overview

Summary by district

Closest races 
Seats where the margin of victory was under 10%:

Retiring incumbents

Democrats 
 District 6: Norman R. Stone Jr. retired.
 District 13: James N. Robey retired.
 District 16: Brian Frosh retired to run for Attorney General of Maryland.
 District 17: Jennie M. Forehand retired.

Republicans 
 District 9: Allan H. Kittleman retired to run for Howard County executive.
 District 34: Nancy Jacobs retired.
 District 35: Barry Glassman retired to run for Harford County executive.

Incumbents defeated

In primary elections

Democrats
 District 44: Verna L. Jones lost renomination to Shirley Nathan-Pulliam.

Republicans
 District 4: David R. Brinkley lost renomination to Michael Hough.
 District 37: Richard F. Colburn lost renomination to Adelaide Eckardt.

In the general election

Democrat
 District 29: Roy Dyson lost to Steve Waugh.

Detailed results

District 1

District 2

District 3

District 4

District 5

District 6

District 7

District 8

District 9

District 10

District 11

District 12

District 13

District 14

District 15

District 16

District 17

District 18

District 19

District 20

District 21

District 22

District 23

District 24

District 25

District 26

District 27

District 28

District 29

District 30

District 31

District 32

District 33

District 34

District 35

District 36

District 37

District 38

District 39

District 40

District 41

District 42

District 43

District 44

District 45

District 46

District 47

Notes

See also
 Elections in Maryland
 2014 United States elections
 2014 Maryland gubernatorial election
 2014 Maryland Attorney General election
 2014 Maryland Comptroller election
 2014 United States House of Representatives elections in Maryland
 2014 United States gubernatorial elections
 2014 Maryland House of Delegates election

References

2014
Senate
Maryland General Assembly